António de Andrade (1580 – March 19, 1634) was a Jesuit priest and explorer from Portugal. He entered the Society of Jesus in 1596. From 1600 until his death in 1634 he was engaged in missionary activity in India. Andrade was the first known European to have crossed the Himalayas and reached Tibet, establishing the first Catholic mission on Tibetan soil.

Life
António de Andrade was born in Oleiros, Portugal. In 1600 he went to Goa, the capital of Portuguese India, where he pursued his higher studies and was ordained a priest. He was one of the Jesuits attached to the court of the Mughal emperor Jahangir, and was head of the Jesuit mission in Agra. In 1624 he left Agra,  headed to Delhi where he and the Jesuit brother Manuel Marques joined a group of Hindu pilgrims bound for the temple of Badrinath located in the Northern part of the present-day Indian state of Uttarakhand. Overcoming incredible hardships in the journey, they crossed the Mana Pass to Tibet, the first Europeans known to have done so.

Kindly received in Tibet by the sovereign of the Western Tibetan kingdom of Guge, in the capital city of Tsaparang, Andrade left after less than a month to obtain formal permission for the mission from the Father-Provincial in Goa, and to get funds and other missionaries to accompany him back to Tsaparang. Andrade returned to Tibet in 1625 and was joined by other Jesuit missionaries. They succeeded in building a church and made many converts, aided by support from the king and other members of the royal family. Andrade returned to Goa in 1629; the mission foundered soon afterward, with the invasion of Guge by Ladakh, the death of the pro-missionary king and the installation of a hostile Ladakhi-controlled government in Tsaparang. The missionaries were persecuted or expelled, the Tibetan Christians were sent to Ladakh, and by 1640 the mission, which had begun with so much promise, was over.

Andrade became the Father-Superior of the Jesuit province of Goa in 1630, leaving this post in 1633 and resuming the rectorship of the College 
of St. Paul. He was also active during this period as a deputy of the Goa Inquisition. He was poisoned on March 4, 1634, and lingered on in agony
until dying on March 19. The Inquisition inquiry into his death revealed that he had been murdered by disgruntled Jesuits at the college, possibly supported by powerful enemies among the Goa authorities and merchants. The matter was hushed up and nobody was ever prosecuted for the crime. Later Jesuit accounts portrayed Andrade as a martyr to the Faith who was killed because of his zeal as an official of the Inquisition.

Andrade's two extensive accounts of Tibet, written in 1624 and 1626, were published in the Portuguese original in Lisbon in 1626 followed by a Spanish translation in Segovia (Spain) in 1628 and a publication in Cracow (Poland) in the same year, and quickly translated into all the major European languages; they had a significant influence on European knowledge of and attitudes toward Tibet. Modern translations of Andrade's accounts into Italian and French are found in Toscano (1977) and Didier (2002). An English translation of Andrade's writings relating to Tibet was published in 2017 by Sweet and Zwilling.

See also
List of topics on the Portuguese Empire in Goa, Bombay-Bassein, and the East Indies
Portuguese Civil Code of Goa and Damaon

References

Bibliography
Desideri, Ippolito. 2010. Mission to Tibet: The Extraordinary Eighteenth-Century Account of Fr. Ippolito Desideri, S.J. trans. Michael Sweet, ed. Leonard Zwilling.
Esteves Pereira, Francisco (editor). 1924. O Descobrimento do Tibet pelo P.Antonio de Andrade. Coimbra: Imprensa da Universidade. 
 1997 reprint.
Didier, Hugues. 1999. Os Portugueses no Tibete. Os primeiros relatos dos jesuitas (1624-1635).
Didier, Hughes. 2002. Les Portugais au Tibet.
Sweet, Michael J. Murder in the Refectory: The Death of António de Andrade, S.J. Catholic Historical Review, 102, no.1, 2016, pp. 26–45.
Sweet, Michael J. (trans. and intro) and Leonard Zwilling (ed.). 2017 More than the Promised Land: Letters and Relations from Tibet by the Jesuit Missionary António de Andrade (1580-1634). Boston: Institute of Jesuit Sources/Boston College.
Tavares, Célia Cristina da Silva. 2006. Jesuítas e Inquisidores em Goa. A Cristianidade Insular (1540-1682). 
Toscano, Giuseppe. 1977. Alla Scoperta del Tibet.
A missão tibetana na correspondência jesuíta (1624-1631): https://teses.usp.br/teses/disponiveis/8/8138/tde-21102009-164743/pt-br.php links

Detailed biography of de Andrade 
The Goa Jesuit Province of the Society of Jesus - The Jesuits in Goa
TYBET - Wielkie Panstwo w Azyey (Tibet - A great country in Asia) - 1628

1580 births
1634 deaths
People from Oleiros, Portugal
Portuguese Roman Catholic missionaries
Portuguese explorers
Portuguese travel writers
Jesuit missionaries in Tibet
Explorers of Central Asia
Assassinated educators
Jesuit missionaries in China
16th-century Portuguese Jesuits
17th-century Portuguese Jesuits
17th-century explorers
Jesuit missionaries in India
Deaths by poisoning